) is a modern fountain sculpture in central Brussels, Belgium. It was commissioned by Denis-Adrien Debouvrie in 1985 and erected in 1987 as a counterpoint to the city's famous . The  bronze statue depicts a little girl with short pigtails, squatting and urinating on a blue-grey limestone base.

The sculpture is now protected from vandalism by iron bars.

History

Conception
He also saw it as a metaphorical way of "restoring equality between men and women" by creating a feminine counterpart to the city's illustrious  sculpture. The idea for the statue is said to have come to him while he was having breakfast one day, and he sketched it out on the tablecloth. Upon completing the sketch, Debouvrie is purported to have said, "Now we have gender equality." The appearance of the girl is also said to have been inspired by Debouvrie's younger sister Jenny's appearance as a child.

Inauguration
Many inauguration ceremonies were held for the statue's reveal in June 1987, two in particular being of note. At the first ceremony, the guests of honour were the mayor of the City of Brussels and The Order of the Friends of Manneken Pis, the non-profit organisation that manages the costumes that Manneken Pis wears. The second ceremony saw the appearance of the Italian politician and former porn star Ilona Staller, also known as "Cicciolina", as a way of symbolising the naturalism that the statue represents.

Eventually, the statue was put behind iron bars to protect it from vandals, as people had been touching the area surrounding the statue and ruining it. This is also to prevent it from being stolen, as its predecessor Manneken Pis had been multiple times in the past.

Legacy

Coin tossing and charity
From the time the statue was erected, passers-by began tossing coins into its basin. Taking note of this, the non-profit organisation Horizon-Espoir ASBL was formed in 1987, with the aim of collecting coins from the statue's basin and donate them to organisations looking to find a treatment for AIDS. Since then, the money has also been donated to organisations like the National Fund for Scientific Research (NFSR) and UNICEF.

The frequent coin tossing also gave birth to a legend: in addition to coin-tossers possibly having a wish of theirs come true—a tradition associated with other fountains the world over—lovers who toss in a coin will be promised fidelity in their love life. A plaque was put up next to the statue describing this:

In December 2021, the plaque was replaced with a new one, written from the perspective of the statue itself:

Impasse de la Fidélité
By 2003, Jeanneke Pis had brought so much attention to the Impasse de la Fidélité that it led to the creation of the Delirium Café, which has since become known worldwide for its extensive beer menu. Several other establishments have also been set up in the alley, thus helping to realise Debouvrie's vision of making it a site in Brussels worth visiting.

See also
 Het Zinneke
 Piss (Černý)
 Sculpture in Brussels
 List of depictions of urine in art

References

Notes

External links

 

Buildings and structures in Brussels
Bronze sculptures in Belgium
1987 sculptures
Tourist attractions in Brussels
Fountains in Belgium
City of Brussels
Fictional Belgian people
Fictional children
Sculptures of children
Squatting position